Leptospermum barneyense is a species of shrub that is endemic to the Mount Barney National Park in Queensland. It has rough, fibrous bark, young branches with conspicuous flanges, lance-shaped leaves, white or pink flowers and hemispherical fruit.

Description
Young branchlets are glabrous with conspicuous flanges. The lower side of the young  leaves are hairy near their base.

Taxonomy and naming
Leptospermum barneyense was first formally described in 2004 by Anthony Bean who published the description in the journal Telopea from specimens collected in the Mount Barney National Park. The specific epithet (barneyense) is a reference to the type location.

Distribution and habitat

Conservation status
This species is classified as of "vulnerable" under the Queensland Government Nature Conservation Act 1992.

References

barneyense
Myrtales of Australia
Flora of Queensland
Plants described in 2004